Das Geheimnis der Santa Margherita is a 1921 German silent historical film directed by Rolf Randolf.

The film's art direction was by Gustav A. Knauer.

Cast

See also
 A Vanished World (1922)
 The Secret of Johann Orth (1932)

References

Bibliography

External links 
 

1921 films
1920s historical films
German historical films
Films of the Weimar Republic
Films directed by Rolf Randolf
German silent feature films
German black-and-white films
1920s German films